Calycibidion is a genus of beetles in the family Cerambycidae, containing the following species:

 Calycibidion multicavum Martins, 1971
 Calycibidion rubricolle Galileo & Martins, 2010
 Calycibidion turbidum Napp & Martins, 1985

References

Ibidionini